Erdal Idrettslag is a Norwegian sports club from Askøy. It has sections for football and martial arts.

The club was founded on 27 June 1944. The club colors are red and white. The men's football team currently resides in the Fifth Division (sixth tier). It last played in the Third Division in 1996.

References

Official site

Football clubs in Norway
Association football clubs established in 1944
Sport in Hordaland
Askøy
1944 establishments in Norway